The White Terror (German:Der weiße Schrecken) is a 1917 German silent film directed by Harry Piel.

The film's art direction was by Kurt Richter.

Cast
 Tilli Bébé as Abenteurerin  
 Bruno Eichgrün 
 Preben J. Rist as Rachesüchtiger Liebhaber

References

Bibliography
 Douglas B. Thomas. The early history of German motion pictures, 1895-1935. Thomas International, 1999.

External links

1917 films
Films of the German Empire
Films directed by Harry Piel
German silent feature films
Films set in the Arctic
German black-and-white films
1910s German films